Byafossen is a village in the municipality of Steinkjer in Trøndelag county, Norway. The Nordlandsbanen railway line passes through the village, but there is not a station here. The village is named after the local  waterfall on the river. The village is usually considered part of the town of Steinkjer urban area.

References

Villages in Trøndelag
Steinkjer